Ronald Holgate (born May 26, 1937, Aberdeen, South Dakota) is an American actor and opera singer. He won the Tony Award for Best Supporting Actor as Richard Henry Lee in the original Broadway production of 1776, a role he reprised in 1972 for the film 1776.

Early life
The son of a school superintendent and a drama teacher, raised in South Dakota, Holgate originally intended to become a classical actor and studied drama with Alvina Krause at Northwestern University. While there, however, he was discovered by Boris Goldovsky, and went on to study opera at both Tanglewood and the New England Conservatory. In 1959, Holgate, a bass-baritone, won second prize in the Metropolitan Opera National Council Auditions, finishing after Teresa Stratas; he went on to tour with Goldovsky's New England Opera Theater. In 1960 he attended the Music Academy of the West summer conservatory.

Career
By the early 1960s, however, Holgate had gone back to theater, only resuming a regular opera career in the 1970s. Roles like the narcissistic Miles Gloriosus in A Funny Thing Happened on the Way to the Forum (which he originated in the show's Broadway premiere) led to him developing a reputation for what Frank Rich called "vain ladies' men."

Until 2005, he worked regularly on and Off-Broadway, in regional theatre, and in over a dozen national and international tours. As an opera singer, Holgate played leading roles in La Boheme, Don Giovanni, and the world premiere of Philip Marshall, among many others. He had an active career as a concert singer, which included performances at Carnegie Hall and a Broadway revue with his first wife, Dorothy Collins (1926–1994).  He and Collins were married from 1966-77. He was featured in the first concert devoted to Stephen Sondheim's work.

Holgate appeared as Richard Henry Lee in 1776. Although he had only one song, "The Lees of Old Virginia", and a scant few lines of additional dialogue, he earned that season's Tony Award as Best Featured Actor in a Musical.

Critic Walter Kerr commented that "there is simply no stopping Mr. Holgate as he explodes with the sheer happiness of having come to exist." (Holgate and fellow 1776 performer William Daniels were nominated in the same, supporting category. Daniels turned down the nomination, because he felt that his role as John Adams was clearly the lead.)

Holgate created the role of the vain opera star Tito Morelli in Lend Me a Tenor. He was Buffalo Bill Cody in the 1999 revised edition of Annie Get Your Gun starring Bernadette Peters and Tom Wopat, and in the early 2000s he toured as Caldwell B. Cladwell in the first national tour of the musical Urinetown. Later in 1999, he played Harrison Howell in the Broadway revival of Kiss Me, Kate; as an inside joke, when he made his initial appearance, the orchestra played the intro to "The Lees of Old Virginia," which roused hearty laughter from audience members who remembered his signature role.

Holgate has few film and television credits. He played Lee again in the film 1776, and was featured in the straight-to-video Men of Means. He has acted occasionally in daytime soap operas, including Another World, Guiding Light, and One Life to Live.

Personal life
Holgate was married to singer Dorothy Collins from 1966 to 1977, to Anny DeGange from 1989 to the present, and has three daughters, Melissa, Chloe, and Lily.

Stage productions
Broadway
 Milk and Honey: chorus
 A Funny Thing Happened on the Way to the Forum: Miles Gloriosus
 Sweet Charity: Vittorio Vidal (one-week vacation replacement for James Luisi)
 1776: Richard Henry Lee
 Saturday Sunday Monday: Luigi Ianniello
 The Grand Tour: Colonel Tadeusz Boleslav Stjerbinsky
 Musical Chairs: Joe Preston
 42nd Street: Julian Marsh (replacement)
 Lend Me a Tenor: Tito Merelli (also West End production)
 Guys and Dolls: Big Jule (replacement)
 Annie Get Your Gun: "Buffalo Bill"
 Kiss Me, Kate: Harrison Howell
Off-Broadway
 Hobo: Jonah
 Hooray! It's a Glorious Day...and all that: Carl Strong
 Blue Plate Special: Larry Finney
 The Sounds of Rodgers and Hammerstein, Part II
 Milk and Honey: Phil Arkin
 Heroes

Awards and nominations
1959 Frederick K. Weyerhauser Scholarship, Metropolitan Opera Auditions
1974 New Jersey Drama Critic's Circle Award: A Little Night Music
1969 Tony Award: winner, 1776: Best Performance by a Featured Actor in a Musical
1979 Tony Award: nominee, The Grand Tour
1992 Detroit Drama Critic's Circle Award: Man of La Mancha
2005 IRNE Award (Independent Reviewers of New England): Urinetown

References

Further reading
 "Holgate, Ron". The Oxford Companion to the American Musical: Theatre, Film, and Television (ed. Thomas S. Hischak. New York: Oxford University Press, 2008;

External links
 
 
 Interview at Playbill.com

1937 births
Living people
American male musical theatre actors
American opera singers
Tony Award winners
People from Aberdeen, South Dakota
Singers from South Dakota
Winners of the Metropolitan Opera National Council Auditions
Male actors from South Dakota
Northwestern University School of Communication alumni
Music Academy of the West alumni